In mathematics, Wall's conjecture denotes one of the following:
 a conjecture of C. T. C. Wall in group theory stating that every finitely generated group is accessible
 a hypothesis of Donald Dines Wall in number theory on the non-existence of Fibonacci-Wieferich primes. This is a separate conjecture from the existence of Wall–Sun–Sun primes, because the question is still open.
 a conjecture of G. E. Wall stating that the number of maximal subgroups of any given finite group is less than the group order, see